William Willetts may refer to:
 William Willetts (sailor), New Zealand yacht racer
 William Willetts (art historian), British scholar of South-East Asian art studies

See also
 William Willett (disambiguation)
 William Willet, American artist